The Martin Short Show is a syndicated talk show, based on the late night model, hosted by Martin Short with announcer/sidekick Michael McGrath. The talk show aired for one season from 1999 to 2000. It was produced by King World Productions. John Blanchard, who had previously worked with Martin Short on SCTV, directed the show.

One of the characters from the show, overweight celebrity interviewer Jiminy Glick, went on to be used several times outside the show, including the spin-off series Primetime Glick.

The show performed poorly in the ratings.

References

External links

1990s American television talk shows
2000s American television talk shows
English-language television shows
1999 American television series debuts
2000 American television series endings
First-run syndicated television programs in the United States
Television series by King World Productions